Delibašić is a South Slavic surname, derived from Turkish deli baş meaning "crazy head". Notable people with the surname include:

Andrija Delibašić (born 1981), Montenegrin footballer
Mirza Delibašić (1954–2001), Bosnian basketball player
Pavle Delibašić (born 1978), Serbian footballer
Selma Delibašić (born 1980), Bosnian-Swedish female basketball player
Slađa Delibašić (born 1968), Serbian pop singer and dancer

Bosnian surnames
Montenegrin surnames
Serbian surnames